Tetraethylammonium tetrachloroferrate is the chemical compound with the formula (N(C2H5)4)FeCl4.  It is the tetraethylammonium salt of the tetrahedral anion [FeCl4]−.

References

Chloro complexes
Iron(III) compounds
Tetraethylammonium salts